Andrew David Kennedy (born 20 March 1940) is a former Australian politician. Born in Ulverstone, Tasmania, he attended University High School in Melbourne and then the University of Melbourne, after which he became a teacher in Victorian state schools. In 1969, he was elected as a Labor member to the Australian House of Representatives in the by-election for the seat of Bendigo following Noel Beaton's resignation. He held the seat until his defeat in 1972. In 1982, he was elected to the Victorian Legislative Assembly as the member for Bendigo, and in 1985 he transferred to Bendigo West, a position he held until 1992 when the Labor government was defeated.

Kennedy's older brother, Cyril James Kennedy, also served in the Victorian state parliament, as the member for the Legislative Council seat of Waverley from 1979 to 1992. The brothers are fifth-generation descendants (great-great-great-grandchildren) of Mannalargenna, a 19th-century Aboriginal Tasmanian leader. Consequently, they are amongst the few Indigenous Australians to have been elected to Australian legislatures. However, Neville Bonner, who entered the Australian Senate in 1971, two years after David Kennedy's election to the House, is generally recognised as the first Aboriginal parliamentarian, and Ken Wyatt, elected in 2010, is generally reckoned as the first Aboriginal member of the lower house. This situation arose due to the Indigenous heritage of the Kennedys being unknown at the time of his elections, with David not self-identifying as Aboriginal at that point.

Notes

References

|-

1940 births
Living people
Australian Labor Party members of the Parliament of Australia
Members of the Australian House of Representatives for Bendigo
Members of the Australian House of Representatives
Members of the Victorian Legislative Assembly
University of Melbourne alumni
People from Ulverstone, Tasmania
Australian people of Indigenous Australian descent
20th-century Australian politicians